NA-53 Rawalpindi-II is a constituency for the National Assembly of Pakistan.

Area
The constituency consists of Gulzar-e-Quaid, Dhoke Lalyal, Railway Housing Scheme 1-A Chaklala, Dhok Chaudrian, Shakrial, Lalazar, Sher Zaman Colony, Morgah, Gulrez, Safari Villas, Police Foundation, Media Town, Lalkurti, Kotha Kalan, Gulshan Abad, Bahria Town (1,2,3,7,8), Rawat, Kalar Syedah, Munawar, Zulfiqar, Chak Beli Khan, Pindori and Army Officers colony.

Members of Parliament

1970–1977: NW-28 Rawalpindi-III

1977–2002: NA-38 Rawalpindi-III

2002–2018: NA-52 Rawalpindi-III

2018-2023: NA-59 Rawalpindi-III

Detailed results

Election 2002 

General elections were held on 10 Oct 2002. Chaudhary Nisar Ali Khan of 
PML-N won by 73,671 votes.

Election 2008 

Nisar Ali Khan successfully retained his native National Assembly seat in elections 2008.

Election 2013 

General elections were held on 11 May 2013. Nisar Ali Khan of PML-N was yet again successful in retaining his native National Assembly Constituency and he won it with a huge margin. National Assembly.

Election 2018

General elections were held on 25 July 2018.

By-election 2023 
A by-election will be held on 16 March 2023 due to the resignation of Ghulam Sarwar Khan, the previous MNA from this seat.

See also
NA-52 Rawalpindi-I
NA-54 Rawalpindi-III

References

External links 
Election result's official website
Delimitation 2018 official website Election Commission of Pakistan

59
R-59